Nicole Kuzmichová or Kuzmich (born October 8, 1997) is a Canadian former competitive ice dancer who competed with Alexandr Sinicyn for the Czech Republic. The two qualified for the free dance at the 2016 and 2017 World Junior Championships.

Personal life 
Nicole Kuzmich was born on October 8, 1997, in Toronto, Ontario, Canada. As of January 2017, she has adopted Kuzmichová as her surname in competition, using the Czech feminine form.

Career

Early career 
Kuzmich began learning to skate in 2000. She competed with Jay Tam on the pre-novice level in the 2010–11 season.

Kuzmich teamed up with Jordan Hockley in June 2011. They appeared for Slovenia at the 2013 World Junior Championships in Milan but were eliminated after placing 27th in the short dance.

Partnership with Sinicyn 
In the spring of 2014, Kuzmich and Alexandr Sinicyn decided to form a partnership for the Czech Republic. Their international debut came in October 2014 on the Junior Grand Prix (JGP) series; they finished 9th at both of their JGP assignments, in Dresden, Germany, and Zagreb, Croatia. At the 2015 World Junior Championships in Tallinn, Estonia, their short dance placement, 22nd, was not enough to qualify for the final segment. They were coached by Carol Lane, Juris Razgulajevs, Jon Lane, and Natalia Karamysheva in Toronto and Oberstdorf.

Kuzmichová/Sinicyn placed 7th at both of their 2015–16 JGP events, in Bratislava, Slovakia, and Linz, Austria. In March 2016, they competed in Debrecen, Hungary, at their second World Junior Championships. The two placed 14th in the first segment and qualified for the free dance, where they placed 10th, lifting them to 11th overall.

Competing in the 2016–17 JGP series, Kuzmichová/Sinicyn placed fourth in Saint-Gervais-les-Bains, France, and won the silver medal in Ostrava, Czech Republic.

Programs

With Sinicyn

With Hockley

Competitive highlights 
GP: Grand Prix; CS: Challenger Series; JGP: Junior Grand Prix

With Sinicyn for the Czech Republic

With Hockley for Slovenia

References

External links 
 

1997 births
Canadian female ice dancers
Czech female ice dancers
Living people
Figure skaters from Toronto
Competitors at the 2017 Winter Universiade